Montgomery County is a county in the U.S. state of Arkansas. As of the 2020 census, the population was 8,484. The county seat is Mount Ida. Montgomery County is Arkansas's 45th county, formed on December 9, 1842, and named after Richard Montgomery, an American Revolutionary War general.

History
Stone spear and dart points found in the area verify that people from the Dalton Culture were present in Montgomery County around 8500 BC. Early signs of houses and American Indian cemeteries are present in and around Caddo Gap, Arkansas, indicating the definite presence of the Caddo Indians having settled in the area in the 13th century and 14th century. In 1541, the explorer Hernando de Soto fought the Tula Indians at Caddo Gap, and he was injured during that battle.

The first white settlers arrived in 1812, when Martin and Mary Collier settled what is now Caddo Gap. They befriended the local tribes, and seemingly had no problems from them whatsoever. Granville Whittington arrived in 1835, and built a road that led from Hot Springs, Arkansas to his farm about a mile north of the settlement of Montgomery. By 1836 when Arkansas received statehood, most of the native Indians were gone. Some of the native Indian women had intermingled and intermarried with local white settlers. Whittington opened a general store that drew customers from the surrounding area, and in 1842 he opened the Mount Ida Post Office in Mount Ida. West of the Ouachita River, settlers from a wagon train wintered in what is now Oden, and decided to stay when the weather cleared. Montgomery County was named after General Richard Montgomery, an American general who died during the American Revolution.

Originally part of the Louisiana Purchase, it was first claimed by Spain, then France, and in 1813 was part of Arkansas County, then in 1818 was part of Clark County. On December 9, 1842, Montgomery County became its own county, with Montgomery as its county seat. In 1850 Salem became the county seat, but later that same year the county seat changed again, to Mount Ida, where Whittington's Post Office was located. Mount Ida incorporated in 1854.

Civil War era
When the Civil War broke out, most of Montgomery County favored the Confederacy. Mount Ida settlers John Lavender and John Simpson formed one company to serve in the Confederate Army, and the 4th Arkansas Infantry originated in Mount Ida also, but after the war few from the company organized by Lavender and Simpson returned to Montgomery County. With mostly women left to tend to the farms, soldiers from both the Confederate and the Union Army raided homes and farms for supplies, leaving settlers with little to eat. After the war, soldiers from both armies settled in the area, building schools and homes. In 1884 Oden built a steam saw, a cotton gin and a gristmill.

Up to modern times
With the arrival of the Missouri Pacific Railroad in Caddo Gap around the turn of the 20th century, Caddo Gap and Black Springs began to thrive. In 1910 the county population reached its peak, with sawmills springing up in several locations. That same year, the town of Womble was settled. It changed its name to Norman in 1925. In 1918 the logging camp of Mauldin, Arkansas sprang up, and a railroad line was built to it from Norman. However, almost overnight in 1936, Mauldin closed up, dismantled everything, and moved on having depleted the virgin timber in the area. This, combined with the Great Depression, had a devastating effect on the county.

Many people moved away to find work elsewhere, while others found employment with the Civilian Conservation Corps. During World War II, people continued to leave Montgomery County, with the men going off to war, and others leaving to find employment in war plants. Mining became one source of local employment for a time, but did not last. Most mines were due to a large abundance of quartz in the county. In 1922 there were eighty three school districts in Montgomery County. Today there are three, Caddo Hills, Mount Ida, and Ouachita River. Cattle, swine, and poultry are now the main areas of employment in the region.

Geography

Major highways
 U.S. Highway 70
 U.S. Highway 270
 Highway 8
 Highway 27
 Highway 88

Adjacent counties
Yell County (north)
Garland County (east)
Hot Spring County (southeast)
Clark County (southeast)
Pike County (south)
Polk County (west)
Scott County (northwest)

National protected area
 Ouachita National Forest (part)

Demographics

2020 census

As of the 2020 United States census, there were 8,484 people, 3,754 households, and 2,563 families residing in the county.

2000 census
As of the 2000 United States Census, there were 9,245 people, 3,785 households, and 2,747 families residing in the county. The population density was 12 people per square mile (5/km2). There were 5,048 housing units at an average density of 6 per square mile (2/km2). The racial makeup of the county was 95.42% White, 0.29% Black or African American, 1.11% Native American, 0.37% Asian, 0.01% Pacific Islander, 1.56% from other races, and 1.23% from two or more races. 2.53% of the population were Hispanic or Latino of any race.

There were 3,785 households, out of which 28.00% had children under the age of 18 living with them, 62.60% were married couples living together, 7.00% had a female householder with no husband present, and 27.40% were non-families. 24.50% of all households were made up of individuals, and 12.20% had someone living alone who was 65 years of age or older. The average household size was 2.41 and the average family size was 2.85.

In the county, the population was spread out, with 23.50% under the age of 18, 6.20% from 18 to 24, 25.00% from 25 to 44, 26.30% from 45 to 64, and 18.90% who were 65 years of age or older. The median age was 42 years. For every 100 females there were 96.20 males. For every 100 females age 18 and over, there were 95.00 males.

The median income for a household in the county was $28,421, and the median income for a family was $32,769. Males had a median income of $25,865 versus $18,063 for females. The per capita income for the county was $14,668. About 13.00% of families and 17.00% of the population were below the poverty line, including 22.50% of those under age 18 and 16.00% of those age 65 or over.

Government
Over the past few election cycles Montgomery County has trended heavily towards the GOP. The last Democrat (as of 2020) to carry this county was Bill Clinton in 1996.

Communities

Cities
Mount Ida (county seat)

Towns
Black Springs
Norman
Oden

Census-designated places
Caddo Gap
Pencil Bluff

Other unincorporated communities
 Alamo
 Black Springs (Black Springs)
 Caddo Gap
 Caney (small parts of Glenwood)
 Center
 Fannie
 Hopper
 Mount Ida (Mount Ida)
 Norman (Norman)
 Oden (Oden)
 Pencil Bluff
 Sims
 Washita

Townships

Notable people
 Osro Cobb, (1904–1996), Republican member of the Arkansas House of Representatives from 1927 to 1930; later the state Republican chairman, and the United States Attorney for the Eastern District of Arkansas during the Little Rock Integration Crisis 
 Mack Ray Edwards (1918–1971), child sex abuser/serial killer; committed suicide by hanging in his prison cell
 Lon Warneke, (1909–1976), Major League Baseball pitcher for the Chicago Cubs and St. Louis Cardinals, was born in Mount Ida.

See also
 National Register of Historic Places listings in Montgomery County, Arkansas

References

External links
Montgomery County entry in the Arkansas Encyclopedia 
Montgomery County Sawmills
Montgomery County Sheriff's Office

 
1842 establishments in Arkansas
Populated places established in 1842